Two ships and a shore establishment of the Royal Navy have borne the name HMS Robin, after the European robin, a type of bird:
 
  was a Heron-class gunboat, built in sections in 1897 and erected in Hong Kong. She was sold in 1928.
  was a river gunboat, launched in 1934 and scuttled in 1941. 
 HMS Robin was a Royal Naval Air Station commissioned in 1943 at RNAS Kirkwall as a tender to HMS Sparrowhawk.  It became an independent command in 1944 and paid off in 1945.

Royal Navy ship names